Everything Is Fine is the third studio album by American country music artist Josh Turner, released on October 30, 2007. "Firecracker" was the first single released, reaching No. 2 on the Hot Country Songs charts, and was followed by "Another Try", which peaked at No. 15 on the same chart. The title track was released as the album's third single and reached No. 20.

The album debuted at number five on the U.S. Billboard 200 chart, selling about 84,000 copies in its first week. On December 3, 2007, it was certified Gold by the RIAA.

"One Woman Man" was previously recorded by George Jones on his 1989 album of the same name, and before that by Johnny Horton, its co-writer, in 1956.

Track listing

Personnel
Musicians
 Chad Cromwell - drums (track 11, 12)
 Eric Darken - percussion (all tracks)
 Jay Dawson - bagpipes (track 8)
 Shannon Forrest - drums (track 1, 3, 5, 7, 8, 9)
 John Gardner - drums (track 2, 4, 6, 10)
 Kevin "Swine" Grantt - bass guitar (all tracks except 8-10, 12), upright bass (tracks 8-10, 12)
 Aubrey Haynie - fiddle (track 1, 2, 3, 5, 6, 9, 10, 11), mandolin (track 4, 6, 7, 8, 10, 11, 12)
 Wes Hightower - background vocals (all tracks except 3)
 Steve Hinson - steel guitar (all tracks except 3, 12), Dobro (track 3)
 Kirk "Jelly Roll" Johnson - harmonica (track 4)
 Mike Johnson - Dobro (track 11), Pedabro (track 12)
 B. James Lowry - acoustic guitar (track 6, 10), high-strung guitar (track 10)
 Liana Manis - background vocals (track 10)
 Gordon Mote - clavinet (track 2, 5), piano (track 3, 4, 6-12), Hammond B-3 organ (track 3, 7, 11), Wurlitzer electric piano (track 4, 7)
 Brent Rowan - electric guitar (all tracks except 3, 12), baritone guitar (all tracks except 5, 9)
 Bryan Sutton - banjo (track 1, 5, 12), National guitar (track 1), acoustic guitar (track 2-5, 7, 8, 9, 11, 12)
 Russell Terrell - background vocals (all tracks except 3)

Strings on "Another Try": Kris Wilkinson, David Angell, David Davidson, Pamela Sixfin, Mary Kathryn Van Osdale, Monisa Angell, Anthony LaMarchina; arranged by John Hobbs and Kris Wilkinson, conducted by John Hobbs

Technical
Brian Barnett - digital editing
Richard Barrow - recording, overdubbing
Drew Bollman - overdubbing
Neal Cappellino - overdubbing
Tyler Moles - digital editing
Justin Niebank - mixing
Frank Rogers - production
Hank Williams - mastering
Brian David Willis - digital editing

Chart performance and certifications
Everything Is Fine peaked at number five on the U.S. Billboard 200, and debuted at number three on the Top Country Albums. In November 2007, it was certified Gold by the RIAA.

Weekly charts

Year-end charts

Sales and certifications

References

2007 albums
MCA Records albums
Josh Turner albums
Albums produced by Frank Rogers (record producer)